Explicit Lyrics is the third studio album recorded by the French artist Ophélie Winter.

Track listing
 "Sache in Progress" (Interlude) (Ophélie Winter, Wayne Beckford)
 "Sache" (Ophélie Winter, Wayne Beckford)
 "Yeah, Yeah, Yeah" (Ophélie Winter, Doudou Masta, Wayne Beckford)
 "Party Now" feat. Wayne "Tatz" Beckford (Ophélie Winter - Wayne Beckford)
 "Definition" (Interlude) (Ophélie Winter, Wayne Beckford)
 "Tout le Monde le Fait" (Ophélie Winter, Wayne Beckford)
 "Appelle Moi, Pt. 1 (Interlude)" feat. Sulee B. Wax (Wallen, Sulee B. Wax)
 "Double Vie" (Wallen, Sulee B. Wax)
 "Viens" (Ophélie Winter, Benjamin Deffe, Wayne Beckford)
 "Vendetta" (Pascale Hospital, Wayne Beckford)
 "Bonnie Parker" (Ophélie Winter, Wayne Beckford)
 "Ouvre" (Ophélie Winter, Noam Kaniel, Wayne Beckford)
 "Quand Les Larmes" (Ophélie Winter, Guy Waku, Wayne Beckford)
 "Wrap" (Interlude) (Ophélie Winter, Wayne Beckford)
 "Something" (Bonus track) (Misty Oldland, Nicolas Neidhardt)

Charts

2002 albums
Ophélie Winter albums
Warner Music France albums